Rainio is a surname of Finnish origin. Notable people with the surname include:

Aino Forsten (1885-1937), born Aina Rainio, Finnish politician and educator
Jussi Rainio (1878-1918), Finnish journalist and politician
Selma Rainio (1873-1939), Finnish missionary
Väinö Rainio (1896-1979), Finnish athlete